Liakat Ali Errol Alibux (born 30 November 1948 in Paramaribo) is a Surinamese politician historically associated to the PALU.

Career 
From 1967 to 1973 he studied sociology at the Erasmus University Rotterdam.

He was Prime Minister of Suriname during a period of military rule under Dési Bouterse. As a suspect in the December murders his appointment, by elected leader Bouterse, as an ambassador to Turkey was criticized by the Netherlands.

References 

|-

Prime Ministers of Suriname
Finance ministers of Suriname
People from Paramaribo
December murders
1948 births
Living people
Erasmus University Rotterdam alumni
Progressive Workers' and Farmers' Union politicians
Ambassadors of Suriname to Turkey